The MPL 75 (Métro Pneus Lyon 1975) is the rubber-tyred electric train type used on the Lyon Metro's lines A and B. The entire fleet was built by Alstom (then Alsthom) and was delivered in two batches in 1978 and 1981.

References

Lyon Metro rolling stock
Electric multiple units of France
750 V DC multiple units
Alstom multiple units